is a Japanese actress and model who is affiliated with Oscar Promotion and MOC Planning. She is a Miyagi University of Education graduate.

Filmography

Television
 Kaitou Sentai Lupinranger VS Keisatsu Sentai Patranger (TV Asahi, 2018), Tsukasa Myoujin/Patren 3gou
 Da rapper bites and becomes a rapper (TV Asahi, 2019),  Rika Suzuki
 Kafka's Tokyo Despair Diary (MBS, 2019), Tsugumi Kuroyanagi
 Sedai Wars (MBS/TBS, 2020), Asami Tamagawa
 Police and Prosecutor (TV Asahi, 2020), Naoko Morioka 
 TAT: Tokyo After Talk (WOWOW, 2020)
 K2: Dodgy Badge Brothers (TBS, 2020),  Misora Ishidate
 Equation To Erase The Teacher (TV Asahi, 2020), Machiko Yasuda
 Kamen Rider Revice (TV Asashi, 2022), Yamagiri Chigusa (Episode 19-20)

Films
 Kaitou Sentai Lupinranger VS Keisatsu Sentai Patranger en Film (2018), Tsukasa Myoujin/Patren 3gou
 Lupinranger VS Patranger VS Kyuranger (2019), as Tsukasa Myoujin/Patren 3gou
 Kishiryu Sentai Ryusoulger VS Lupinranger VS Patranger the Movie (2020), as Tsukasa Myoujin/Patren 3gou

Biography
2014: Weekly Young Jump "Galcon 2014" Second Prize Grand Prix
2015: Sportsland SUGO 2015 SUGO Race Queen
2016: Sportsland SUGO 2016 SUGO Race Queen
2017: Oscar Promotion "The Most Beautiful Twenties Contest" Semi Grand Prix

References

External links
 – Oscar Promotion 
 

Japanese gravure models
People from Misawa, Aomori
Actors from Aomori Prefecture
Models from Aomori Prefecture
1994 births
Living people
21st-century Japanese actresses